The Arbasayi Formation, also rendered A’erbasayi, is located in the Uygur Autonomous Region in Xinjiang.This formation contains Volcano-clastic rock with interbeds of purple conglomerate, felsitic porphyry, quartz porphyry, tuffite and andesite intercalated with rhyolitic porphyry. This formation is dated to the Early Permian period.

References

Permian System of Asia
Geologic formations of China
Geology of Xinjiang